Justicia orbicularis is a species of plant in the family Acanthaceae. It is found in Cameroon and Nigeria. Its natural habitat is subtropical or tropical moist lowland forests. It is threatened by habitat loss.

References

orbicularis
Vulnerable plants
Taxonomy articles created by Polbot